Victoria Mary Prentis,  ( Boswell; born 24 March 1971) is a British politician who has served as the Attorney General for England and Wales since October 2022. Prentis has served as the Member of Parliament for Banbury since 2015. She is a member of the Conservative Party. 

Prentis was Parliamentary Private Secretary (PPS) to junior ministers in the Department for Transport between July 2016 and June 2017, and was the Parliamentary Private Secretary (PPS) to the Leader of the House of Commons from June 2017 until February 2020. She was appointed Parliamentary Under-Secretary of State for Farming, Fisheries and Food in February 2020, and was promoted to become Minister of State for Farming, Fisheries and Food in September 2021, during the second cabinet reshuffle of the second Johnson ministry. She was appointed Minister of State for Work and Welfare by Prime Minister Liz Truss in September 2022. After Liz Truss resigned and Rishi Sunak became Prime Minister, Prentis was appointed Attorney General for England and Wales. She was appointed to the Privy Council on 27 October 2022.

She was re-elected as Banbury's MP in 2017 and 2019.

Early life and career
Prentis was born Victoria Boswell, in Banbury, and grew up on the family farm in nearby Aynho. She has two sisters. She was educated at Royal Holloway, University of London and Downing College, Cambridge, from where she received degrees in English and Law respectively. She is the daughter of Lord Boswell of Aynho, who was MP for Daventry from 1987 to 2010.

Prentis qualified as a barrister in 1995. She joined the Civil Service in 1997, leaving in November 2014. Her last job for the government was co-leading (in a jobshare) the "Justice and Security team" at the Treasury Solicitor's Department.

Parliamentary career
In November 2014, Prentis was selected as the Conservative candidate for the Banbury constituency at the 2015 general election. She retained the safe seat for the Conservatives (held by them since 1922). In Parliament she sat on the Justice Select Committee and the Select Committee on Statutory Instruments. Prentis is an opponent of High Speed 2, believing it will affect her constituency. She rebelled against the Conservative government when the HS2 Bill received its second reading in the House of Commons in March 2016.

Prentis was a founding supporter of Conservatives for Reform in Europe, a group which campaigned in support of the UK's membership of a reformed European Union. Accordingly, she declared that she would vote remain in the 2016 referendum on the UK's membership of the EU.

Prentis supported Theresa May's candidacy during the 2016 Conservative leadership contest. She was appointed Parliamentary Private Secretary to junior ministers in the Department for Transport in July 2016.

She was re-elected as the MP for Banbury in the 2017 general election.

In May 2019, she endorsed candidate Rory Stewart for the leadership of the Conservative Party.

Prentis stated that she voted to remain in the European Union but has since given her support to Boris Johnson's deal.

In February 2020, Prentis joined the Department for Environment, Food and Rural Affairs as the Parliamentary Under-Secretary of State for Farming, Fisheries and Food.

In January 2021, Prentis said during an interview that her jaw did not drop when she read the EU–UK Trade and Cooperation Agreement which includes farming, fisheries and food because she was "very busy organising the local nativity trail". She voted in favour of the agreement in-line with government policy.

In March 2022, Prentis was the first British MP to take a Ukrainian refugee in her house amidst the War in Ukraine.

On 7 September, Prentis was appointed Minister of State for Work and Welfare at the Department for Work and Pensions by Prime Minister Liz Truss in the Truss Ministry.

Attorney General

Following the appointment of Rishi Sunak as Prime Minister on 25 October 2022, Prentis was appointed by him as Attorney General for England and Wales and was officially sworn in as such on 16 November 2022. She was appointed to the Privy Council on 27 October 2022 and sworn of it on 14 December 2022. As is tradition for those appointed as Attorney General who are not already King's Counsel, Prentis was appointed as King's Counsel on 23 November 2022.

Personal life
Prentis is married to Sebastian Prentis, a judge in the Insolvency and Companies Court, whom she met when they were both students at the University of Cambridge. The couple have two daughters and live in Somerton, Oxfordshire.

Notes

References

External links

1971 births
Living people
Alumni of Royal Holloway, University of London
Alumni of Downing College, Cambridge
British civil servants
Attorneys General for England and Wales
Advocates General for Northern Ireland
Conservative Party (UK) MPs for English constituencies
Daughters of life peers
Female members of the Parliament of the United Kingdom for English constituencies
People from Banbury
UK MPs 2015–2017
UK MPs 2017–2019
21st-century British women politicians
People from Aynho
UK MPs 2019–present
21st-century English women
21st-century English people
English King's Counsel
21st-century King's Counsel
Members of the Privy Council of the United Kingdom